László Vadnay (12 June 1898 - 1 December 1972) was a Hungarian sports shooter. He competed in the 25 m pistol event at the 1936 Summer Olympics.

References

1898 births
1972 deaths
Hungarian male sport shooters
Olympic shooters of Hungary
Shooters at the 1936 Summer Olympics
Sportspeople from Uzhhorod